The Uganda Sugar Manufacturers' Association (USMA), is a registered, professional organization that brings together four large sugar manufacturers in Uganda. The association aims at promoting sustainable, profitable manufacture of sugar and related products, in a sustainable, environmentally friendly fashion, for the economic development of the industry, employees and country. USMA represents Uganda in matters related to the International Sugar Organization.

Location
The association maintains its headquarters at 133-135 Sixth Street, in the Industrial Area of Kampala, Uganda's capital and largest city. The geographical coordinates of the headquarters of USMA are:0°19'01.0"N, 32°36'16.0"E (Latitude:0.316944; Longitude:32.604444).

Overview
The members of USMA are: (a) Kakira Sugar Works (b) Kinyara Sugar Works Limited (c) Sugar Corporation of Uganda Limited and (d) Sango Bay Estates Limited. According to USMA, sugar production in Uganda in the calendar year 2014, is as illustrated in the table below.

In 2011, eight new sugar manufactures were issued licenses, bringing the total to 15 in the country then. This led to friction between the new entrants and the established large producers who belong to USMA.

Governance
USMA is governed by a five person board of directors.
 Mwine Jim Kabeho (Kakira Sugar Works): Chairman
 P. Ramadasan (Kinyara Sugar Works Limited): Vice Chairman
 D. N. Mishra (Sugar Corporation of Uganda Limited): Member
 Christian Vincke (Kakira Sugar Works): Member
 Assistant Commissioner of Trade, MTIC (Government Representative): Member

See also
Sugar production in Uganda
List of sugar manufacturers in Uganda

References

External links

Sugar price to drop further As of 19 February 2018.

Organizations established in 1995
1995 establishments in Uganda
Trade associations based in Uganda
Manufacturing trade associations
Organisations based in Kampala